Katia's Russian Tea Room was a restaurant located in San Francisco, California, specializing in Russian cuisine. The establishment, owned by Katia Troosh, was a critic's favorite and won the Zagat Award of Distinction. It closed in 2018.

See also
 List of Russian restaurants

References

External links

Restaurants in San Francisco
Defunct restaurants in the San Francisco Bay Area
Russian-American culture in California
Russian restaurants in the United States
2018 disestablishments in California
Restaurants disestablished in 2018